Vikramjit Singh Chaudhary is an Indian politician representing the Phillaur Assembly constituency in the Punjab Legislative Assembly. He is a member of Indian National Congress.

Personal life 
Vikramjit Singh Chaudhary was born in Jalandhar and is the son of Jalandhar Member of Parliament Santokh Singh Chaudhary and former Director of Public Instruction (Colleges) Karamjit Kaur Chaudhary, grandson of former Agriculture Minister of Punjab Master Gurbanta Singh, nephew of former Local Government Minister Chaudhary Jagjit Singh and cousin of former Member of Punjab Legislative Assembly Chaudhary Surinder Singh. He studied in Bishop Cotton School, Shimla and Government College, Jalandhar. He is married to Shveta Raj Chaudhary and has two daughters.

Political career 
The Chaudhary family has contested every assembly election of Punjab since 1936. Vikramjit Singh Chaudhary started his political career with his election as the President of District Youth Congress, Jalandhar (Rural) in 2008. He was elected president of the Punjab Pradesh Youth Congress in December 2011. In 2013, he undertook ‘Adhikar Yatra’ in Punjab during which he walked 1108 kilometres in 30 days to meet the people and highlight the work done by Congress to empower and uplift them. He contested 2017 Punjab Legislative Assembly election, but lost to Baldev Singh Khaira of Shiromani Akali Dal.

2022 Punjab Assembly Elections 
Vikramjit Singh Chaudhary won 2022 Punjab Legislative Assembly election by defeating sitting MLA Baldev Singh Khaira by 12,303 votes, which was the highest winning margin in Phillaur constituency since India's Independence and the highest winning margin among Congress candidates in Punjab in the 2022 elections.

References 

21st-century Indian politicians

Year of birth missing (living people)
Living people
Punjab, India MLAs 2022–2027
Indian National Congress politicians from Punjab, India